Derby is a census-designated place in central Darby Township, Pickaway County, Ohio, United States.  Although it is unincorporated, it is assigned the ZIP code 43117.

History
Derby had its start when the railroad was extended to that point. A post office was established at Derby in 1881.

References

Census-designated places in Pickaway County, Ohio